netsniff-ng is a free Linux network analyzer and networking toolkit originally written by Daniel Borkmann. Its gain of performance is reached by zero-copy mechanisms for network packets (RX_RING, TX_RING), so that the Linux kernel does not need to copy packets from kernel space to user space via system calls such as recvmsg(). libpcap, starting with release 1.0.0, also supports the zero-copy mechanism on Linux for capturing (RX_RING), so programs using libpcap also use that mechanism on Linux.

Overview

netsniff-ng was initially created as a network sniffer with support of the Linux kernel packet-mmap interface for network packets, but later on, more tools have been added to make it a useful toolkit such as the iproute2 suite, for instance. Through the kernel's zero-copy interface, efficient packet processing can be reached even on commodity hardware. For instance, Gigabit Ethernet wire-speed has been reached with netsniff-ng's trafgen. The netsniff-ng toolkit does not depend on the libpcap library. Moreover, no special operating system patches are needed to run the toolkit. netsniff-ng is free software and has been released under the terms of the GNU General Public License version 2.

The toolkit currently consists of a network analyzer, packet capturer and replayer, a wire-rate traffic generator, an encrypted multiuser IP tunnel, a Berkeley Packet Filter compiler, networking statistic tools, an autonomous system trace route and more:

 netsniff-ng, a zero-copy analyzer, packet capturer and replayer, itself supporting the pcap file format
 trafgen, a zero-copy wire-rate traffic generator
 mausezahn, a packet generator and analyzer for HW/SW appliances with a Cisco-CLI
 bpfc, a Berkeley Packet Filter compiler
 ifpps, a top-like kernel networking statistics tool
 flowtop, a top-like netfilter connection tracking tool with Geo-IP information
 curvetun, a lightweight multiuser IP tunnel based on elliptic-curve cryptography
 astraceroute, an autonomous system trace route utility with Geo-IP information

Distribution specific packages are available for all major operating system distributions such as Debian or Fedora Linux. It has also been added to Xplico's Network Forensic Toolkit, GRML Linux, SecurityOnion, and to the Network Security Toolkit. The netsniff-ng toolkit is also used in academia.

Basic commands working in netsniff-ng
In these examples, it is assumed that eth0 is the used network interface. 
Programs in the netsniff-ng suite accept long options, e.g., --in ( -i ), --out ( -o ), --dev ( -d ).

 For geographical AS TCP SYN probe trace route to a website:
 astraceroute -d eth0 -N -S -H <host e.g., netsniff-ng.org>
 For kernel networking statistics within promiscuous mode:
 ifpps -d eth0 -p
 For high-speed network packet traffic generation, trafgen.txf is the packet configuration:
 trafgen -d eth0 -c trafgen.txf
 For compiling a Berkeley Packet Filter fubar.bpf:
 bpfc fubar.bpf
 For live-tracking of current TCP connections (including protocol, application name, city and country of source and destination):
 flowtop
 For efficiently dumping network traffic in a pcap file:
 netsniff-ng -i eth0 -o dump.pcap -s -b 0

Platforms 
The netsniff-ng toolkit currently runs only on Linux systems. Its developers decline a port to Microsoft Windows.

See also
 Comparison of packet analyzers
 OpenVPN
 Packet generator
 Tcpdump
 Traceroute
 Traffic generation model
 Wireshark
 Xplico

References

External links
 Official netsniff-ng website
 netsniff-ng FAQ
 netsniff-ng at GitHub
 netsniff-ng mailing list archive
 Linux' packet mmap(), BPF, and the netsniff-ng toolkit, talk at DevConf (long)
 Packet sockets, BPF, netsniff-ng, talk at OpenSourceDays (short)
 

Free network management software
Free network-related software
Free software programmed in C
Linux-only free software
Network analyzers
Unix network-related software